The 1999–2000 EHF Women's Cup Winners' Cup was the twenty-fourth edition of EHF's competition for women's handball national cup champions. It ran from October 1, 1999, to May 28, 2000.

1997 Champions League champion Mar Valencia became the first Spanish team to win the Cup Winners' Cup, defeating 1988 and 1989 champion Kuban Krasnodar in the final.

Results

References

Women's EHF Cup Winners' Cup
1999 in handball
2000 in handball